Javier Guerra may refer to:

Javier Guerra (runner) (born 1983), Spanish long-distance runner
Javier Guerra (water polo) (born 1954), Mexican Olympic water polo player
Javy Guerra (baseball, born 1995),  Panamanian professional baseball pitcher for the San Diego Padres
Javy Guerra (baseball, born 1985), American professional baseball pitcher for the Washington Nationals